Hugo Wallace Weaving  (born 4 April 1960) is an English actor. Born in Colonial Nigeria to English parents, he has resided in Australia for the entirety of his career. He is the recipient of six Australian Academy of Cinema and Television Arts Awards (AACTA) and has also been recognised as an Honorary Officer of the Order of Australia.

Weaving landed his first major role as English cricket captain Douglas Jardine on the Australian television series Bodyline (1984). Continuing to act in Australia, he rose to prominence with his appearances in the films Proof (1991) and The Adventures of Priscilla, Queen of the Desert (1994), winning his first AACTA Award for Best Actor in a Leading Role with the former. By the turn of the millennium, Weaving achieved international recognition through appearances in mainstream American productions. His most notable film roles include Agent Smith in the first three The Matrix films (1999–2003), Elrond in The Lord of the Rings (2001–2003) and The Hobbit (2012–2014) trilogies, the title character in V for Vendetta (2005), and Johann Schmidt / Red Skull in the Marvel Cinematic Universe (MCU) film Captain America: The First Avenger (2011).

In addition to his live action appearances, Weaving has had several voice over roles, including in the films Babe (1995), Happy Feet (2006) and Happy Feet Two (2011), and the Transformers series as Megatron (2007–2011). He also reprised his roles of Agent Smith and Elrond in Matrix and Lord of the Rings video game adaptations.

Early life and education 
Weaving was born on 4 April 1960 at the University of Ibadan Teaching Hospital, in Ibadan, Nigeria to English parents; he is the son of Anne Lennard (born 1934), a tour guide and former teacher, and Wallace Weaving (born 1929), a seismologist, who met as students at the University of Bristol. His maternal grandmother was Belgian. A year after his birth, his family returned to the United Kingdom, living in Bedford and Brighton before moving to Melbourne and Sydney in Australia; Johannesburg in South Africa; and then returning to the United Kingdom again. 

While in the UK, he attended The Downs School, Wraxall, near Bristol, and Queen Elizabeth's Hospital. While at the Downs School, in 1973 Weaving played one of his first theatrical roles, taking the part of Captain Asquith in Robert Bolt's The Thwarting of Baron Bolligrew. His family moved back to Australia in 1976, where he attended Knox Grammar School in Sydney. He graduated from Sydney's National Institute of Dramatic Art in 1981.

Career

1984–1998
Weaving's first television role was in the 1984 Australian television series Bodyline, as the English cricket captain Douglas Jardine. Weaving appeared in the Australian miniseries The Dirtwater Dynasty in 1988 and as Geoffrey Chambers in the drama Barlow and Chambers: A Long Way From Home. He starred opposite Nicole Kidman in the 1989 TV mini-series Bangkok Hilton. In 1991, Weaving received the Australian Film Institute's "Best Actor" award for his performance in the low-budget Proof as the blind photographer. He appeared as Sir John in Yahoo Serious's 1993 comedy Reckless Kelly, a lampoon of Australian outlaw Ned Kelly.

In the mid-1990s, Weaving portrayed drag queen Anthony "Tick" Belrose/Mitzi Del Bra in the 1994 film Priscilla, Queen of the Desert, and provided the voice of Rex the sheepdog in the 1995 family film Babe and its 1998 sequel Babe: Pig in the City. In 1998, he received the "Best Actor" award from the Montreal World Film Festival for his performance as a suspected serial killer in The Interview.

1999–2010
Weaving played the enigmatic and evil-minded Agent Smith in the 1999 film The Matrix. He later reprised that role in the film's 2003 sequels, The Matrix Reloaded and The Matrix Revolutions. He was a voice actor in the cartoon film The Magic Pudding.

He received additional acclaim in the role of half-elven lord Elrond in Peter Jackson's three-film adaptation of The Lord of the Rings, released between 2001 and 2003. Weaving was the main actor in Andrew Kotatko's award-winning film Everything Goes (2004). He starred as a heroin-addicted ex-rugby league player in the 2005 Australian indie film Little Fish, opposite Cate Blanchett. Weaving played the title role as V in the 2005 film V for Vendetta, in which he was reunited with the Wachowskis, creators of The Matrix trilogy, who wrote the adapted screenplay. Actor James Purefoy was originally signed to play the role, but was fired six weeks into filming over creative differences. Weaving reshot most of Purefoy's scenes as V (even though his face is never seen) apart from a couple of minor dialogue-free scenes early in the film while stuntman David Leitch performed all of V's stunts.

Weaving reprised his role as Elrond for the video game The Lord of the Rings: The Battle for Middle-Earth II. He regularly appears in productions by the Sydney Theatre Company (STC). In 2006, he worked with Cate Blanchett on a reprise of the STC production of Hedda Gabler in New York City. In a controversial move by director Michael Bay, Weaving was chosen as the Decepticon leader Megatron vocally in the 2007 live-action film Transformers, rather than using the original version of the character's voice created by the voice actor Frank Welker.

Weaving himself was unaware of the controversy and had accepted the role based on Michael Bay's personal request; in a November 2008 Sun Herald interview, he said he had never seen Transformers. Though Weaving reprised his role in two sequels, he does not have much personal investment in the Transformers films. In February 2010, Weaving revealed to The Age: "Director Michael Bay talks to me on the phone. I've never met him. We were doing the voice for the second one and I still hadn't seen the first one. I still didn't really know who the characters were and I didn't know what anything was. It's a voice job, for sure, and people assume I've spent my life working on it, but I really know so little about it." In 2012, Weaving said to Collider: "It was one of the only things I've ever done where I had no knowledge of it, I didn't care about it, I didn't think about it. They wanted me to do it. In one way, I regret that bit. I don't regret doing it, but I very rarely do something if it's meaningless. It was meaningless to me, honestly. I don't mean that in any nasty way."

Weaving played a supporting role in Joe Johnston's 2010 remake of the 1941 film The Wolfman, starring Benicio del Toro. Immediately after Wolfman wrapped in spring 2008, he returned home to Australia to film a lead role in the film Last Ride, directed by Glendyn Ivin. In early 2009, Guillermo del Toro, then director of The Hobbit films, prequels to The Lord of the Rings, confirmed his intent to again cast Weaving as Elrond of Rivendell in a BBC interview. When asked about reprising the role, Weaving replied that he was game, but had not officially been approached. Del Toro eventually left the project; Peter Jackson decided to direct the films himself but Weaving was not officially confirmed in the cast until May 2011.

Weaving spent the summer of 2009 starring in the Melbourne Theatre Company's production of God of Carnage, portraying the caustic lawyer Alain Reille. He returned to the stage in November 2010 in Sydney Theatre Company's Uncle Vanya, co-starring Cate Blanchett and Richard Roxburgh. Weaving filmed a guest role on Roxburgh's Australian TV series Rake in May 2010.

In May 2009, Weaving accepted a co-starring role in the docudrama Oranges and Sunshine, about the forced migration of thousands of British children to Australia in the 1950s. Filming began in autumn 2009 in Nottingham, England, and Adelaide, South Australia, and continued through January 2010. The film premiered at the Rome International Film Festival on 28 October 2010 and garnered positive reviews. 2010 also saw the release of Legend of the Guardians (formerly The Guardians of Ga'Hoole), in which Weaving has another high-profile voice role, portraying two different owls named Noctus and Grimble in Zack Snyder's film adaptation of Kathryn Lasky's popular series of children's books.

On 4 May 2010, it was officially confirmed by Marvel Studios that Weaving would play the fictional Nazi Red Skull in the superhero film Captain America: The First Avenger. Weaving completed filming his role on the project in September 2010 and returned to Sydney to prepare for Uncle Vanya. It is unlikely he will sign on for any further installments in the Marvel Cinematic Universe; in an August 2011 Baltimore Sun interview, the actor confided he is weary of typecasting and of "blockbuster" films in general: "I think I've about had enough... I'm not sure how many more of them I'll make. It doesn't feel to me as though they've been the majority of my work, though that's probably the way it seems to most other people."

2011–present

On 13 March 2011, The Key Man, which Weaving filmed in 2006, finally debuted at the South By Southwest Festival in Austin, Texas. The child migrant saga Oranges and Sunshine opened in the UK on 1 April, the culmination of months of success on the festival circuit in late 2010-early 2011. In March, the Sydney Theatre Company and John F. Kennedy Center for the Performing Arts announced that STC's 2010 production of Chekhov's Uncle Vanya would be reprised in Washington, D.C., during the month of August. In April, months of speculation finally ended when Weaving appeared on The Hobbit's New Zealand set, shortly before a production spokesman officially confirmed the actor's return as Elrond in Peter Jackson's prequel trilogy to The Lord of the Rings. He was part of the cast of the Wachowskis' adaptation of David Mitchell's novel Cloud Atlas. The project, co-starring Tom Hanks, Ben Whishaw, Halle Berry, Jim Broadbent, and Susan Sarandon, began filming in September 2011 and was released in October 2012.

2012 also found Weaving re-focusing on his theatrical career, with a return to the Sydney Theatre Company to star in a new adaptation of Christopher Hampton's play Les Liaisons Dangereuses in March. He portrayed the notorious Vicomte de Valmont, a character he first played onstage in 1987. His frequent stage foil Pamela Rabe costarred. Weaving and Cate Blanchett reprised their roles in STC's internationally lauded production of Uncle Vanya for a ten-day run at New York's Lincoln Center in July.

The busy actor also joined the cast of three forthcoming Australian films in summer 2012. The Western-tinged police thriller Mystery Road, written and directed by Ivan Sen, began filming in June 2012. Weaving appeared in the prison drama Healing for director Craig Monahan, with whom he previously made The Interview (1998) and Peaches (2005). He appeared in a segment of the Australian anthology film The Turning, based on Tim Winton's collection of linked stories, entitled "The Commission", directed by David Wenham. He ended 2013 co-starring with Richard Roxburgh and Philip Quast in Samuel Beckett's Waiting For Godot, for the Sydney Theatre Company.

In the spring of 2013, Weaving reprised the Agent Smith role for a General Electric television commercial for their "Brilliant Machines" innovations in healthcare management technology, which was slated to air during a break from 13 April's edition of Saturday Night Live, and subsequently continued to receive multiple airings on major cable networks.

From 26 July to 27 September 2014, Weaving played the titular role of Sydney Theatre Company's production of Macbeth. In an unusual treatment of the Shakespearian tragedy by young Sydney director Kip Williams, Weaving's performance was described by Peter Gotting of The Guardian as "the role of his career".

In October 2015, Weaving joined the cast of the film adaption of Craig Silvey's novel Jasper Jones.

In 2018, Weaving starred as Thaddeus Valentine in Mortal Engines.

In 2020, Weaving starred as Alfred in Tony Kushner's adaptation of The Visit.

Other roles
In 2004, Weaving became an ambassador for Australian animal rights organisation Voiceless, the animal protection institute. He attends events, promotes Voiceless in interviews, and assists in their judging of annual grants recipients. 

, Weaving is on the board of the Adelaide Film Festival.

Personal life
When he was 13 years old, Weaving was diagnosed with epilepsy. Although the condition rarely affected him and stopped in his early 30s, he still chooses not to drive, given the risk of a seizure. He has been in a relationship with Katrina Greenwood since 1984; they live in Sydney and have two children together: Harry Greenwood, an actor, and Holly Greenwood, an artist. Their children were given their mother's surname, which Weavings's son described as the family's "stand against the patriarchy."

Weaving also has a brother and a sister. He is the uncle of actress Samara Weaving, who also began her career in Australia before transitioning to American roles. Both appeared in the 2013 Australian film Mystery Road. His younger niece Morgan Weaving appeared on the Australian soap opera Home and Away alongside her sister.

Awards
 1991 – Australian Film Institute Awards, Best Actor in a Lead Role: Proof
 1998 – Australian Film Institute Awards, Best Actor in a Lead Role: The Interview
 2005 – Australian Film Institute Awards, Best Actor in a Lead Role: Little Fish
 2007 – The Constellation Awards, Best Male Performance in a 2006 Science Fiction Film, TV Movie, or Miniseries: V for Vendetta
 2011 – Sydney Theatre Award, Best Supporting Actor:Sydney Theatre Company's Uncle Vanya
 2012 – Helen Hayes Award, Best Supporting Performer, Non-Resident Production: Sydney Theatre Company's Uncle Vanya
 2018 – Helpmann Award for Best Male Actor in a Play, for Arturo Ui in the Sydney Theatre Company's The Resistible Rise of Arturo Ui
 2018 – Satellite Award for Best Supporting Actor – Series, Miniseries or Television Film: Patrick Melrose
 2020 – Honorary Officer of the Order of Australia

Filmography

Film

Television

Video games

References

Further reading

 The Dictionary of Performing Arts in Australia – Theatre . Film . Radio . Television – Volume 1 – Ann Atkinson, Linsay Knight, Margaret McPhee – Allen & Unwin Pty. Ltd., 1996
 The Australian Film and Television Companion – compiled by Tony Harrison – Simon & Schuster Australia, 1994

External links

 
 Hugo Weaving at TCM
 

1960 births
Living people
20th-century British male actors
21st-century British male actors
Audiobook narrators
Best Actor AACTA Award winners
Best Supporting Actor AACTA Award winners
British emigrants to Australia
British male film actors
British male radio actors
British male Shakespearean actors
British male stage actors
British male television actors
British male video game actors
British male voice actors
British people of Belgian descent
Helpmann Award winners
Honorary Officers of the Order of Australia
Male actors from Ibadan
Musicians from Ibadan
National Institute of Dramatic Art alumni
Outstanding Performance by a Cast in a Motion Picture Screen Actors Guild Award winners
People educated at Knox Grammar School
People educated at Queen Elizabeth's Hospital, Bristol
People from Ibadan
People with epilepsy